Elections to the Georgia State Senate were held on November 8, 2022 alongside the other 2022 United States elections. All 56 seats were up for election.

Retirements

Democrats
District 2: Lester Jackson retired to run for Commissioner of Labor.
District 6: Jen Jordan retired to run for Attorney General.
District 48: Michelle Au retired to run for state representative from District 50.

Republicans
District 3: Sheila McNeill retired.
District 7: Tyler Harper retired to run for Commissioner of Agriculture.
District 14: Bruce Thompson retired to run for Commissioner of Labor.
District 25: Burt Jones retired to run for Lieutenant Governor.
District 37: Lindsey Tippins retired.
District 49: Butch Miller retired to run for Lieutenant Governor.
District 53: Jeff Mullis retired.

Predictions

Closest races 
Seats where the margin of victory was under 10%:

Results 

Thanks to redistricting, District 7 moved from southern Georgia to the Atlanta region.

References

See also 

2022 Georgia (U.S. state) elections
Georgia State Senate elections
Georgia Senate